Wicker is a ghost town in Brazos County, in the U.S. state of Texas. It is located within the Bryan-College Station metropolitan area.

History
The area in what is now known as Wicker today may have been settled in the early 1900s as a railroad station on the International-Great Northern Railroad. It also had a church in the 1930s, but no population estimates were recorded.

Geography

Education
Today, Wicker is located within the College Station Independent School District.

References

Ghost towns in Texas